Mobolade Abimbola Ajomale (born 31 August 1995) is a Canadian sprinter. He competed in the 60 metres event at the 2016 IAAF World Indoor Championships. He won a bronze medal as part Canada's 2016 Olympic team in the 4 x 100 m relay.

Ajomale was part of the 4 x 100 m relay team, they finished third in their heats. In the final the team came agonizingly close to a medal and replaced Ajomale with Andre de Grasse. The team was an agonizingly close 0.02 seconds behind the third place United States team. However, the USA team was later disqualified for an improper baton pass, handing the bronze to Canada and Brown who ran the final as a team with anchor De Grasse, Brendon Rodney, Akeem Haynes, and Aaron Brown.

In August 2017, Ajomale competed in the 2017 World Championships in Athletics representing Canada in the 4 x 100 metres relay. Missing their anchor Andre De Grasse, the Canadian relay team ultimately placed sixth in the finals.

Competition record

Personal bests
Outdoor
100 metres – 10.15 (+0.7 m/s, Edmonton 2016)
200 metres – 20.45 (-0.9 m/s, Charlotte 2018)
400 meters - 47.30(Oxy 2017)
Indoor
60 metres – 6.57 (Pittsburg 2016)
200 metres – 20.82 (Pittsburg 2016)
400 meters - 47.22 (Seattle 2017)

References

External links
 
 
 Academy of Art University athlete page for Mobolade Ajomale

1995 births
Living people
Athletes from London
Canadian sportspeople of Nigerian descent
Canadian male sprinters
Athletes (track and field) at the 2016 Summer Olympics
Olympic track and field athletes of Canada
Olympic bronze medalists for Canada
Olympic bronze medalists in athletics (track and field)
Medalists at the 2016 Summer Olympics
Academy of Art University alumni
World Athletics Championships athletes for Canada
Athletes (track and field) at the 2019 Pan American Games
Pan American Games track and field athletes for Canada
Competitors at the 2015 Summer Universiade
21st-century Canadian people